Live is the first live album by Slime.

Track listing
 A.C.A.B.
 Hey Punk
 Legal, illegal, scheissegal (legal, illegal, I don't care)
 Etikette tötet (Etiquette kills)
 Alle gegen Alle (Everybody vs. Everybody)
 Disco
 Tod (death)
 Yankees raus (Yankees out)
 Iran
 Störtebecker
 Untergang (Downfall)
 Der Kampf geht weiter (The struggle continues)
 4. Reich (The fourth Reich)
 Deutschland (Germany)

Slime (band) albums
1984 live albums
Albums produced by Harris Johns